Ankit Aggarwal (born 5 June 1983) was an Indian cricketer. And BCCI level - B coach. He is Zca u-16 fielding coach and HPCA U-19 Head Coach.

He was a middle-handed batsman and leg-break bowler who played for Himachal Pradesh. He was born in Kangra.

Aggarwal made a single first-class appearance for the side, during the 2004–05 season, against Jharkhand. From the tailend, he scored 11 runs in the first innings in which he batted, and a duck in the second.

Aggarwal bowled 5 overs during the match, conceding 30 runs.

References

1983 births
Living people
Indian cricketers
Himachal Pradesh cricketers
People from Kangra, Himachal Pradesh